The Yarkon River, also Yarqon River or Jarkon River (Nahal HaYarkon, Nahr al-Auja), is a river in central Israel. The source of the Yarkon ("Greenish" in Hebrew) is at Tel Afek (Antipatris), north of Petah Tikva. It flows west through Gush Dan and Tel Aviv's Yarkon Park into the Mediterranean Sea. Its Arabic name, al-Auja, means "the meandering". The Yarkon is the largest coastal river in Israel, at 27.5 km in length.

History

Iron Age
The Yarkon was the northern boundary of the territory of the Philistines. During the time of the Assyrian rule over the country, a fortress was built in a site known today as Tell Qudadi, on the northern bank of the river, next to its estuary.

Ottoman Period
The Yarkon formed the southern border of the vilayet of Beirut during the late Ottoman period.

World War I
The Arabic name of the river, al-Auja ("the meandering one"), is shared with  Wadi Auja, another small stream that flows into the Jordan Valley north of Jericho. During World War I this coincidence led to the term of "the line of the two Aujas" referring to a strategic line connecting the two river valleys and taken by the expeditionary forces of General Allenby during his early 1918 advance against the Ottoman army.

The mouth of the river was conquered already during the late-1917 Battle of Jaffa.

Mandate period
In the Mandatory period, the British government granted a number of concessions, including to Pinhas Rutenberg's Jaffa Electric Company exclusive rights to generate, distribute, and sell electricity in the District of Jaffa. These rights were delivered through the “Auja Concession”, which was formally signed on September 12, 1921. The Concession had authorized the company to generate electricity by means of hydroelectric turbines that would exploit the water power of the Yarkon River to supply electricity to the administrative District of Jaffa. The district comprised Jaffa, the oldest and at the time still most important town in the area, the fast growing town of Tel Aviv north of it, and other smaller locations. Yet the plan to generate electricity by hydroelectric means never materialized, and instead the company designed and built a powerhouse that produced electricity by means of diesel-fueled engines.

State of Israel
The river became increasingly polluted after the 1950s, many blaming this on the construction of the Reading Power Station which is situated near its mouth.

When the river's headwaters were diverted to the Negev via the National Water Carrier for irrigation purposes, the state of the Yarkon declined. As sewage replaced the flow of fresh water, habitats were destroyed and flora and fauna disappeared. This was exacerbated by continuous discharges of industrial effluents and municipal sewage into the rivers, which allowed algae to multiply. On July 14, 1997, the infamous Maccabiah bridge collapse led to the death of four athletes, three of which died due to infections caused by exposure to the polluted river water. Subsequent and ongoing cleanup projects, some government-run, some benefitting from financial aid from Jewish donors from Australia, and some with regional character supported by the NGO FoEME, helped improve the quality of the water.

Yarkon River Authority
In 1988, the Yarkon River Authority was established to revitalize the river and make sections of it suitable for sailing, fishing, swimming and other recreation. Water quality improved after the construction of modern sewage treatment plants in Hod Hasharon and Ramat Hasharon. The river was dredged to restore its original depth and natural flow. River banks were raised and reinforced, hiking and bicycling paths were built, and picnic and fishing areas were developed with the help of contributions from the Australian Jewish community via the Jewish National Fund.

Vegetation and Wildlife
The Yarkon River Authority website has a detailed list of vegetation and wildlife that can be found in and around the river. 
Mammals include: Nutria (coypu); Swamp cat; and Golden jackal.  
Although not mentioned by The Yarkon River Authority, mongoose has also been spotted by visitors and hikers.

Maccabiah disaster

On July 14, 1997, four members of the Australian delegation to the Maccabiah Games were killed and 60 injured as a result of the collapse of a temporary pedestrian bridge over the Yarkon. The deaths were eventually traced to a fungal infection caused by aspiration of the heavily polluted water.

See also
Ayalon River

Further reading
 Eran Eldar, ‘The Yarkon is always green’: the ecological problems of the Yarkon River, Israel affairs, Volume 24, 2018 - Issue 5

References

External links

Yarkon River Authority 
Yarkon River Authority  
Nahr Abī Fuṭrus, Brill: Online Reference Works

Rivers of Israel
Environmental issues in Israel
Landforms of Central District (Israel)
Philistia